Yolyn is an unincorporated community in Logan County, West Virginia, United States. Yolyn had a post office, which closed on March 3, 2007.

References

Unincorporated communities in Logan County, West Virginia
Unincorporated communities in West Virginia
Coal towns in West Virginia